"Flaws" is a song by British band Bastille. It is the third single from their debut studio album Bad Blood. The song was the band's debut single; it was first released in 2011 through the independent label Young and Lost Club as a double A-side 7-inch single with their song "Icarus". The single was later re-released through Virgin Records as a digital download on 21 October 2012, featuring remixes and new B-side track "Durban Skies", peaking at number 21 on the UK Singles Chart on this occasion. "Flaws" was released for a third time on 3 March 2014, but did not improve upon its previous peak.

Composition
"Flaws" makes extensive use of compound quadruple meter ( time).

Music video
Two music videos have been produced. The first accompanied the 2012 release of "Flaws" and was first released onto YouTube on 12 September 2012 at a total length of three minutes and forty-one seconds. A second video released in 2014 for the single's re-release documents the band's experiences of 2013 via a video montage of several of their performances.

Track listing
Digital download
 "Flaws" – 3:37
 "Durban Skies" – 4:11
 "Flaws" (Cinematic's In My Soul Remix) – 4:29
 "Flaws" (Live from The Scala) – 3:45
 "Flaws" (music video) – 3:41

Charts

Weekly charts

Year-end charts

Certifications

Release history

References

2011 songs
2011 debut singles
Bastille (band) songs
Virgin Records singles